Richard Matthews (born 17 May 1950) is a New Zealand former cricketer. He played twelve first-class matches for Auckland between 1969 and 1976.

See also
 List of Auckland representative cricketers

References

External links
 

1950 births
Living people
New Zealand cricketers
Auckland cricketers
Cricketers from Auckland